The Mercedes-Benz 500 E (W124.036) is a high-performance version of the W124 sold by Mercedes-Benz from 1990 to 1995. The 500 E was created in close cooperation with Porsche. With its engineering department being fully occupied with the development of the new S-Class, Mercedes-Benz commissioned Porsche in 1989 to redesign the W124 chassis to fit the 5.0L V8 used in the SL into it, along with the necessary changes on the suspension system and drive train. When the car was ready, it was found that its widened wings didn't fit through the W124 assembly line in Sindelfingen in three places. Hence Porsche was also commissioned to assemble the car. As a side-effect this arrangement provided workload for Porsche's plant, as the company was in crisis at the time, and its factory capacity was underutilized.

During production Mercedes-Benz delivered parts to Porsche's "Reutter-Bau" plant in Zuffenhausen (an urban district of Stuttgart) where the 500 E chassis were hand-assembled. When finished the chassis were transported by truck to the Mercedes-Benz assembly plant in Sindelfingen to be painted. As soon as the paint was dry the varnished chassis were then shipped back to Porsche's "Rössle-Bau" in Zuffenhausen where the engine was put in and the car completed. For final inspection and delivery the vehicles again were transported to Sindelfingen. This process took a full 18 days per car.

Design began in 1989. Called '500 E' through to model year 1993, for model year 1994 it was face-lifted along with the rest of the range and renamed to 'E 500'. The chassis constructed by Porsche was also used to produce the 400 E (W124.034), that was technically identical to its big brother, save its 4.2L V8 also used in the S-Class and some other minor changes. The 400 E (later renamed 'E 420') was produced in Sindelfingen, since it lacked the widened wings and thus was perfectly understated as it looked like one of its lesser siblings.

In Germany, the 500 E first came on sale in late 1990, making its first appearance in the Mercedes-Benz October 1, 1990 pricelist, with a retail price of DM134,520. By January 2, 1993, the price had risen to DM145,590, and would stay at it until the car went off the market in late 1994, it was last available in the August 1, 1994 pricelist. In the United States, the car first became available as a 1992 model with a retail price of $81,800 and was available until MY 1994.

Specifications and general information 
The 500 E had a naturally aspirated 5.0L V8 engine derived from the 500 SL (R129) roadster. Sports car braking performance also came from SL components: front SL 500 300 mm disks with 4-piston callipers came installed on the 1992 and early 1993 cars. The later 1993, and all 1994 cars came with the upgraded 320 mm set taken from the 600 SL. Rear brakes on all years were 278 mm brakes from the 500 SL. In the USA, the 500 E came fully equipped, with the only options available to the buyer being a dealer-installed CD changer and an integrated cellular telephone. The 500 E only came in left hand drive, and had four leather sport seats supplied by Recaro (the front seats were generally heated).

Called the "Wolf in Sheep's Clothing" by the press, performance tests of the day yielded results that were widely considered impressive: 0–100 km/h (0–62 mph) times of 5.5 to 6.0 seconds and acceleration through the quarter-mile (0.4 km) in 14.1 seconds at 163 km/h (101 mph). The top speed was electronically limited to 250 km/h (155.3 mph). It was rated at 16.8 L/100 km (14 mpg) in the city and 13.8 L/100 km (17 mpg) on the highway.

With its aggressive stance due to a 38mm wider track, 23mm lower profile, flared wings, side skirts, front air-dam and wide tyres, the 500 E is easily distinguished from its lesser brethren. Because of its appearance, limited numbers, hand-built construction, and unique pedigree, the 500 E is already considered a "modern classic", even within Mercedes-Benz.

Engine

Production figures and yearly changes 

1528 of the "super" sports sedans were imported into the USA between late 1991 and late 1994, or roughly 500 cars per year of importation.

Production figures

Import numbers by key countries 

It is little-known, but 120 cars were produced between January and                                                                                                                                                                                                                  May 1995, as last-request cars for special customers before the series ceased production. These last cars were produced in Porsche's Rössle building alongside Audi RS2 sport wagons, as that production contract went into full swing with the same work-staff that built the 500E and E500.
The 500 E/E 500 underwent few significant changes during its three-year production run. Models from 1992 and 1993 are virtually indistinguishable from each other on the exterior, with the most notable change being a slightly less powerful (-7 HP) engine in the 1993 and 1994 model for USA. The 1994 E 500 model is more easily identified because of the cosmetic changes that affected all E-Class cars that year (updated headlights, grille, and trunk-lid; the bumper scuff bars were painted the same color as the car). The engine, however, remained unchanged from the 1993 500 E. 1994 models carried an upgraded sound system made by Becker or Alpine, replacing the two-piece Becker 1432 unit used in model year 1992 and 1993 cars. Significantly, 1994 models had larger front and rear brakes than 1992 and 1993 models, courtesy of the R129 SL600 roadster. Numerous running changes were made to the car's mechanical systems during its production life.  All 500 E and E 500 models imported to the United States and Canada were compliant with the more stringent California emissions (a so-called "50-state car", legal for sale in all 50 states).The 500E and E500 were known by Porsche as Type 2758 in that company's official nomenclature. As of June 2011, an example of a 1995 E500 Limited is on display in the new Porsche Museum in Zuffenhausen, Germany.

Aftermarket modifications 
Common performance improvements include wheel and tire replacement, aftermarket exhaust kits, and replacement or reprogramming of the Electronic Control Unit, which removes the 250 km/h (~155 mph) speed governor. To boost acceleration times, some owners disable the car's slip reduction feature and program the automatic transmission to start in first gear instead of the normal second gear.  Numerous other modifications exist for the car, including increased displacement up to and including 6.5 liters, nitrous-oxide systems and a few custom supercharger systems to boost output to well over 400 HP.

E 500 Limited 
During the 1994 model year, Mercedes-Benz introduced the E 500 Limited variant.  Originally intended as a limited edition trim package, with 500 copies to be produced, Mercedes-Benz ended up producing 951 of these models during 1994 and into 1995.  The E 500 Limited was designated by code "958" on the data card.  It consisted of trim upgrades, including a mottled, colored leather pattern on the center inserts of the front and rear seats, steering wheel, and gear shift lever; exclusive "bird's-eye maple" interior wood on the dashboard, doors, and front and rear center consoles; 17" EVO-II alloy wheels; a slight drop in ride height over regular E 500 models, specially edged and color-coded floor mats; and an owner's manual package with leather cover matching the seat leather inserts. The seat insert leather was available in three color choices, specified by the buyer:  gray, green and red.  The E 500 Limited could be combined with the E 60 AMG option mentioned below, and these cars are considered among the rarest and most prized varants available, with only 45 cars containing the "957" and "958" codes on the data cards.  It is possible that additional E 500 Limited models were later converted to E 60 AMG specification after purchase.  E 500 Limited models could also be ordered with the standard E 500 burl walnut interior wood, if desired by the purchaser.

E 60 AMG 
There was also a specialised E 60 AMG model built in very limited numbers from 1994 to 1995 which had the 6.0L V8 engine. The vehicle made 381bhp and can reach 0-60 mph in 5.3 seconds. The vehicle was equipped with the "Limited" sports interior, 17" EVO-II alloys together with uprated AMG sports suspension and AMG twin outlet exhaust system. Otherwise, the brakes and body remained the same. The E500 and E 60 AMG both came with the flared front and rear wheel arches with larger front bumpers and front foglights. The "957" AMG Technology Package in the VIN of the vehicle almost guarantees the vehicle is an original E 60 as left the factory. A number of E500s have also been converted to E 60s by replacing the engine with a 6.0L V8, but do not carry the "957" code on their MB factory data cards. Another giveaway is the AMG engine is stamped "M 119 E 60" together with "AMG" written along the airbox, instead of "Mercedes-Benz".

 M119 6.0L V-8 Engine producing 381BHP
 EVO-II 17" alloy wheels
 Some with Sportline two-tone interior
 Birds-eye maple dark trim
 AMG Suspension
 AMG Exhaust
 E 60 AMG lettering and AMG engine stamps
 957 "AMG Technology Package" in VIN

References

External links 
E500.org
500Eboard forum

500 E
Sports sedans
Rear-wheel-drive vehicles
Cars introduced in 1991
Cars discontinued in 1994
Porsche